, sometimes called the Matsumoto fragment, is a Japanese animated filmstrip that is the oldest known work of animation from Japan. Its creator is unknown. Evidence suggests it was made somewhere between 1907 and 1912, so it may predate the earliest displays of Western animated films in Japan. It was discovered in a collection of films and projectors in Kyoto in 2005.

The three-second filmstrip depicts a boy who writes "", removes his hat, and bows. The frames were stencilled in red and black using a device for making magic lantern slides, and the filmstrip was fastened in a loop for continuous play.

Description

Katsudō Shashin consists of a series of cartoon images on fifty frames of a celluloid strip and lasts three seconds at sixteen frames per second. It depicts a young boy in a sailor suit who writes the kanji characters "" (katsudō shashin, "moving picture" or "Activity photo") from right to left, then turns to the viewer, removes his hat, and bows. Katsudō Shashin is a provisional title for the film, whose actual title is unknown.

Unlike in traditional animation, the frames were not produced by photographing the images, but rather were impressed onto film using a stencil. This was done with a kappa-ban, a device for stencilling magic lantern slides. The images were in red and black on a strip of 35 mm film whose ends were fastened in a loop for continuous viewing.

Background

Imported animation projectors
Early printed animation films for optical toys such as the zoetrope predated projected film animation. German toy manufacturer Gebrüder Bing presented a cinematograph at a toy festival in Nuremberg in 1898; soon other toy manufacturers sold similar devices. Live-action films for these devices were expensive to make; possibly as early as 1898 animated films for these devices were on sale, and could be fastened in loops for continuous viewing. Imports of these German devices appeared in Japan at least as early as 1904; films for them likely included animation loops.

Projected film technology arrived in Japan from the West in 1896–97. The earliest display of foreign animation in Japanese theatres that can be dated with certainty is of the French animator Émile Cohl's The Nipper's Transformations (1911), which premièred in Tokyo on 15 April 1912. Works by Ōten Shimokawa, Seitarō Kitayama, and Jun'ichi Kōuchi in 1917 were the first Japanese animated films to reach theatre screens. The films are lost, but a few have been discovered in "toy movie" versions for viewing at home on hand-cranked projectors; the oldest to survive is Hanawa Hekonai meitō no maki (1917), titled Namakura-gatana in its home version.

Rediscovery
In December 2004, a secondhand dealer in Kyoto contacted Natsuki Matsumoto, an expert in iconography at the Osaka University of Arts. The dealer had obtained a collection of films and projectors from an old Kyoto family, and Matsumoto arrived the next month to fetch them. The collection included three projectors, eleven 35mm films, and thirteen glass magic lantern slides.

When Matsumoto found Katsudō Shashin in the collection, the filmstrip was in poor condition. The collection included three Western animated filmstrips; Katsudō Shashin may have been made in imitation of such examples of German or other Western animation. Based on evidence such as the likely manufacture dates of the projectors in the collection, Matsumoto and animation historian  determined the film was most likely made in the late Meiji period, which ended in 1912; historian Frederick S. Litten has suggested  as a likely date, and that "a production date before 1905 or after 1912 is unlikely". At the time, movie theatres were rare in Japan; evidence suggests Katsudō Shashin was mass-produced to be sold to wealthy owners of home projectors. The creator of the filmstrip remains unknown; to Matsumoto, the relatively poor quality and low-tech printing technique indicate it was likely from a smaller company.

The discovery was widely covered in Japanese media. Given its speculated date of creation, the film would have been contemporary to—or even have predated—early animated works by Cohl and the American animators J. Stuart Blackton and Winsor McCay. The newspaper Asahi Shimbun acknowledged the importance of the discovery of Meiji-period animation, but expressed reservations about placing the film in the genealogy of Japanese animation, writing that it is "controversial that  should even be called animation in the contemporary sense".

See also

 Cinema of Japan
 History of animation
 History of anime
 List of rediscovered films
 List of anime by release date (pre-1939)

Notes

References

Works cited

External links

1907 films
1907 animated films
1900s animated short films
1900s anime films
1910s animated short films
1910s anime films
Anime short films
Articles containing video clips
1900s rediscovered films
Works of unknown authorship
Japanese silent films
Silent films in color
Rediscovered Japanese films